Biston insularis is a moth of the  family Geometridae. It is found in Sundaland.

External links
The Moths of Borneo

Bistonini
Moths described in 1894